Margarites refulgens is a species of sea snail, a marine gastropod mollusk in the family Margaritidae, the turban snails.

Description
The height of the shell attains 6 mm, its diameter also 6 mm.

Distribution
This species occurs in Antarctic waters (the Weddell Sea) and subantarctic waters off the South Sandwich Islands at depths between 200 m and 1100 m.

References

 Smith, E. A. 1907. Mollusca. II. Gastropoda. National Antarctic Expedition 1901-1904, Natural History 2: 12 pp., 2 pls. British Museum (Natural History): London. 
 Engl W. (2012) Shells of Antarctica. Hackenheim: Conchbooks. 402 pp

refulgens
Gastropods described in 1907